Shareholder rebellion occurs when the owners of a corporation work to throw out management or oppose their decisions. Shareholder rebellion may occur at an annual general meeting or through a proxy battle. Shareholders may also threaten to collapse a firm's stock price through concentrated selling. In 1998, the Rockefeller family led a shareholder revolt against Exxon over its climate change policy. In 2005, Michael Eisner retired after Walt Disney's nephew, Roy Disney, led a shareholder revolt, claiming Eisner was a micromanager who had caused a creative brain drain. In 2010, British Petroleum and Shell faced a shareholder revolt over their Canadian tar sands policy.

Recently, shareholder rebellions have occurred over the issue of executive compensation at Cable and Wireless and Shell; Shell in response unveiled a plan to curb executive compensation and bonuses.
According to some analysts, institutional shareholders have been lax about holding management accountable because they were concentrating on picking correct stocks rather than protecting their interests in the stocks they owned.

Shareholder revolts are becoming more common, with a record number of advisory “Say on Pay” votes in the US failing to win majority support in 2018.

History

On 24 January 1609, Amsterdam-based businessman Isaac Le Maire filed a petition against the Dutch East India Company (VOC), marking the first recorded expression of shareholder activism or shareholder rebellion.

See also
Shareholder activism
Shareholder oppression

References

Rebellion